New Plymouth Girls' High School is a girls' state secondary school in Strandon, New Plymouth, New Zealand. The school separated from New Plymouth High School in 1914, leaving New Plymouth Boys' High School on the old site.

It is currently one of two of New Plymouth's girls' schools along with Sacred Heart Girls' College and has a current roll of  students.

Students are put into four houses for school activities such as swimming sports, athletics, and house plays. These houses are Tokomaru (yellow), Kurahaupo (blue), Aotea (red) and Tainui (green). The houses are named after four of the first Māori waka to arrive in New Zealand.

Notable staff
 Ida Gaskin – politician, Mastermind winner
 Leila Hurle – schoolteacher, schools inspector

Principals

Notable alumni

 Mackenzie Barry – association footballer
 Daisy Basham – radio personality
 Michaela Blyde – rugby sevens player
 Kendra Cocksedge – rugby union player
 Dale Copeland – collage and assemblage artist
 Trish Gregory – fashion designer and businesswoman
 Paige Hareb – professional surfer
 Leila Hurle – schoolteacher, schools inspector
 Michele Leggott – poet, academic
 Melanie Lynskey – actor
 Margaret Mutu – Ngāti Kahu leader and academic
 Debbie Ngarewa-Packer – politician
 Jean Sandel - surgeon
 Carmel Sepuloni – politician
 Holly Shanahan – actress
 Toni Street – television presenter and sports commentator
 Beatrice Tinsley – astronomer and cosmologist

References

Schools in New Plymouth
Girls' schools in New Zealand
Educational institutions established in 1885
1885 establishments in New Zealand
Secondary schools in Taranaki